The Ministry of Civil Aviation & Air Transport of the Republic of Somaliland (MoCA) was a somaliland government ministry which is concerned about civil aviation, overseeing airport facilities, air traffic services and carriage of passengers and goods by air. The ministry also sets civil aviation regulations, sets airworthiness and all flight rules, to offer competitive and qualitative aviation services in order to fulfill the local and international requirements in the aviation sector. The current General Manager Omer Zayid Abdillahi Aden

See also
 Politics of Somaliland

References

External links
Official Site of the Government of Somaliland

1993 establishments in Somalia
Government agencies established in 1993
Government ministries of Somaliland